Cyprus competed at the 2014 Summer Youth Olympics, in Nanjing, China from 16 August to 28 August 2014.

Medalists

Athletics

Cyprus qualified two athletes.

Qualification Legend: Q=Final A (medal); qB=Final B (non-medal); qC=Final C (non-medal); qD=Final D (non-medal); qE=Final E (non-medal)

Girls
Track & road events

Gymnastics

Artistic Gymnastics

Cyprus qualified one athlete based on its performance at the 2014 European MAG Championships.

Boys

Swimming

Cyprus qualified two swimmers.

Girls

Tennis

Cyprus qualified one athlete based on the 9 June 2014 ITF World Junior Rankings.

Singles

Doubles

References

2014 in Cypriot sport
Nations at the 2014 Summer Youth Olympics
Cyprus at the Youth Olympics